Moisés Giroldi Vera (May 9, 1950 – October 4, 1989) was a Panamanian military commander noted for his coup attempt against military leader Manuel Noriega in 1989. Giroldi was executed in the military barracks in San Miguelito after the coup was suppressed.

References

1989 deaths
Panamanian military commanders
Panamanian murder victims
Executed Panamanian people
People executed by Panama by firearm
People murdered in Panama
Panamanian people of Italian descent
1950 births